Ashley Day may refer to:

 Ashley Day (cricketer, born 1969), English former cricketer
 Ashley Day (cricketer, born 1999), Australian cricketer